Lieyu Township (Liehyu) (pinyin: Lièyǔ Xiāng; Hokkien POJ: Lia̍t-sū-hiong) is a rural township in Kinmen County (Quemoy), Fujian Province, Republic of China (Taiwan). It mainly consists of Lesser Kinmen (Pīnyīn: Xiǎojīnmén), Dadan, and Erdan, three islands of the ROC located to the west of Greater Kinmen and immediately to the east of Xiamen (Amoy) of the People's Republic of China.

Name
According to tradition, Greater Kinmen/Kinmen Island and Lesser Kinmen/Lieyu were originally one island. Lieyu was split-off ( lie) from Kinmen Island, hence the name Lieyu.

History

The first people arrived from the Central Plains of China during the Tang Dynasty and quickly developed the island. The population quickly multiplied. During the Tang Dynasty, a horse pasture was set up on the island. During the Song Dynasty, a salt works was constructed. During the Ming Dynasty, a frontier command was constructed. During the Qing Dynasty, a garrison was sent to protect against Japanese pirates.

On July 26, 1950, ROC forces on the Dadan Island (Tatan), in total 298 soldiers, repulsed an attack (大擔島戰役) from a People's Liberation Army force of 700 soldiers that landed on the island. In January 1985, a boat of surrendered Chinese fishermen were executed on Shi Islet by military orders. Donggang Bay was the site of another 1987 Lieyu Massacre.

Geography

Lieyu Township includes numerous islands and islets. Some of the larger among those islands and islets include:
Lesser Kinmen (Hsiao Kinmen, Lieyu)
Dadan Island  ( to the southwest of Lesser Kinmen)
Erdan Island (二膽島) ( to the southwest of Lesser Kinmen)
Sandan, Sidan, and Wudan
Fuxing Islet (Fuhsing Islet; Phaktia)
Menghu Islet (Tiger Island)
Shi Islet (Lion Islet)
Binlang Islet ('Areca Nut Islet')

Administrative divisions

Lieyu Township is divided into five rural villages:
 Linhu Village
 Shangqi/Shangchi Village
 Xikou/Sikou Village
 Huangpu Village
 Shanglin Village

Politics
The government of the People's Republic of China claims Kinmen County (Jinmen County in pinyin) as part of Quanzhou City in its own Fujian province.

Infrastructure
 Xihu Reservoir

Tourist attractions
 Bada Tower
 Dadan Island
 Erdan Island
 Hujingtou Battle Museum
 Jiugong Tunnel
 Landmine Museum
 Lieyu Township Culture Museum
 Lingshui Lake

Transportation

Water
The township houses one ferry pier named Jiugong Pier which sails to Shuitou Pier in Jincheng Township, Greater Kinmen Island.

Road
In the future, Lieyu Township will be connected to Jinning Township in Greater Kinmen Island by Kinmen Bridge which is currently still under construction.

See also
 List of islands of Taiwan

References

Further reading
 
 Lin Ma-Teng, (2016). .

External links

  Kinmen County Government official website